This is a list of American plays:

0-9 
 $1200 a Year: A Comedy in Three Acts (1920), by Edna Ferber and Newman Levy
 45 Seconds from Broadway (2001), by Neil Simon
 8 (2011), by Dustin Lance Black

A 
 A-Haunting We Will Go (1981), by Tim Kelly
 A Counterfeit Presentment (1877), by William Dean Howells
 A Delicate Balance (1966), by Edward Albee
 A Streetcar Named Desire (1947), by Tennessee Williams
 A Memory of Two Mondays (1955), by Arthur Miller
 A View from the Bridge (1955), by Arthur Miller
 Abe Lincoln in Illinois (1938), by Robert E. Sherwood
 The Adding Machine (1923), by Elmer Rice
 After the Fall (1964), by Arthur Miller
 Agnes of God (1979), by John Pielmeier
 The Aliens (2010), by Annie Baker
 All Because of Agatha (1964), by Jonathan Troy
 All My Sons (1947), by Arthur Miller
 All New People (2011), by Zach Braff
 All Summer Long (1953), by Robert Anderson
 All the Way (2012), by Robert Schenkkan
 All the Way Home (1960), by Tad Mosel
 American Buffalo (1975), by David Mamet
 The American Clock (1980), by Arthur Miller
 The American Dream (1961), by Edward Albee
 The American Way (2011), by Jim Beaver
 The Anarchist (2012), by David Mamet
 And Still I Rise (1978), by Maya Angelou
 André (1798), by William Dunlap
 Anna Christie (1921), by Eugene O'Neill
 Anne of the Thousand Days (1948), by Maxwell Anderson
 And Things That Go Bump in the Night (1964), by Terrence McNally
 Angels in America (1991), by Tony Kushner
 Arsenic and Old Lace (1939), by Joseph Kesselring
 As You Like It, or Anything You Want To, Also Known as Rotterdam and Parmesan Are Dead (1975), by Jim Beaver
 Aunt Bam's Place (2011), by Tyler Perry
 Avanti! (1968), by Samuel A. Taylor
 Awake and Sing! (1935), by Clifford Odets

B 
 Bad Habits (1974), by Terrence McNally
 Barefoot in the Park (1963), by Neil Simon
 Battle of Angels (1940) (rewritten in 1957 as Orpheus Descending), by Tennessee Williams
 Beekman Place (1964), by Samuel A. Taylor
 The Best Man (1960), by Gore Vidal
 Beyond the Horizon (1918), by Eugene O'Neill
 Biloxi Blues (1984), by Neil Simon
 Black Bart and the Sacred Hills (1977), by August Wilson
 Black Nativity (1961), by Langston Hughes
 The Blue Hour (1979), by David Mamet
 Bobbi Boland (2001), by Nancy Hasty
 Bobby Gould in Hell (1989), by David Mamet
 Born Yesterday (1946), by Garson Kanin
 Boston Marriage (1999), by David Mamet
 Botticelli (1968), by Terrence McNally
 The Boys in the Band (1968), by Mart Crowley
 Bride of Brackenloch (1987), by Rick Abbot
A Bright Room Called Day (1987), by Tony Kushner
 Brighton Beach Memoirs (1982), by Neil Simon
 Bringing It All Back Home (1969), by Terrence McNally
 Broadway Bound (1986), by Neil Simon
 Broken Glass (1994), by Arthur Miller
 A Bronx Tale (1988), by Chazz Palminteri
 Bullets Over Broadway (2014), by Woody Allen
 Bus Stop (1955), by William Inge
 By the Sea, By the Sea, By the Beautiful Sea (1995), by Terrence McNally, Lanford Wilson, and Joe Pintauro

C 
 Cafe Crown (1942), by Hy Kraft
 California Suite (1976), by Neil Simon
Candle in the Wind (1941), by Maxwell Anderson
 Candles to the Sun (1936), by Tennessee Williams
 Cat on a Hot Tin Roof (1955), by Tennessee Williams
 Chapter Two (1977), by Neil Simon
 Children of a Lesser God (1979), by Mark Medoff
 China Doll (2015), by David Mamet
 Choir Boy (2013), by Tarell Alvin McCraney
The Christians (2015), by Lucas Hnath
 The Cocktail Party (1949), by T.S. Eliot
 The Coldest Day of the Year (1989), by August Wilson
 Come Back, Little Sheba (1950), by William Inge
 Come Back to the Five and Dime, Jimmy Dean, Jimmy Dean (1976), by Ed Graczyk
 Come Blow Your Horn (1961), by Neil Simon
 Come on Strong (1962), by Garson Kanin
 The Confidential Clerk (1954), by T.S. Eliot
 The Cop and the Anthem (1973), by Jim Beaver
 Corpus Christi (1998), by Terrence McNally
 The Creation of the World and Other Business (1972), by Arthur Miller
 The Crucible (1953), by Arthur Miller
 The Cryptogram (1994), by David Mamet

D 
 Daddy's Dyin' (Who's Got The Will?) (1987), Del Shores
Dana H. (2019), by Lucas Hnath
 The Dark at the Top of the Stairs (1957), by William Inge
 Death (1975), by Woody Allen
 Death of a Salesman (1949), by Arthur Miller
 The Death of Bessie Smith (1960), by Edward Albee
Death Tax (2012), by Lucas Hnath
Decade (2011), by Tony Kushner
 Dedication or The Stuff of Dreams (2005), by Terrence McNally
 Desire Under the Elms (1924), by Eugene O'Neill
 Deuce (2007), by Terrence McNally
 Diary of a Mad Black Woman (2001), by Tyler Perry
 Dinner at Eight (1932), by Edna Ferber and George S. Kaufman
 The Dinner Party (1999), by Neil Simon
 Dirty Blonde (2000), by Claudia Shear
 Does a Tiger Wear a Necktie? (1969), by Don Petersen
A Doll's House, Part 2 (2017), by Lucas Hnath
 Don't Drink the Water (1967), by Woody Allen
 Don't Go Away Mad (1947), by William Saroyan
 Don't You Want to Be Free? (1938), by Langston Hughes
 Dream Girl (1945), by Elmer Rice
 The Duck Variations (1972), by David Mamet

E 
 Edmond (1982), by David Mamet
 The Egotist (1922), by Ben Hecht
 The Elder Statesman (1958), by T.S. Eliot
 The Elephant Man (1977), by Bernard Pomerance
 Elmer and Lily (1939), by William Saroyan
 Emma (1976), by Howard Zinn
 The Emperor Jones  (1920), by Eugene O'Neill
 Emperor of Haiti (1936), by Langston Hughes

F 
 Faith of Our Fathers (1950), by Paul Eliot Green
 The Family Reunion (1939), by T.S. Eliot
 Faustus (2004), by David Mamet
 The Feast of Ortolans (1937), by Maxwell Anderson
 Fences (1985), by August Wilson
 A Few Good Men (1989), by Aaron Sorkin
 The Fifth Column (1938), by Ernest Hemingway
 Finishing the Picture (2004), by Arthur Miller
 First Love (1961), by Samuel A. Taylor
 The Floating Light Bulb (1981), by Woody Allen
 The Flying Machine: A One-Act Play for Three Men (1953), by Ray Bradbury
 Fools (1981), by Neil Simon
 Fortitude  (1968), by Kurt Vonnegut
 Frankie and Johnny in the Clair de Lune (1982), by Terrence McNally
 The Frog Prince (1982), by David Mamet
 The Front Page (1928), by Ben Hecht and Charles MacArthur
 Fugitive Kind (1937), by Tennessee Williams
 Fullerton Street (1980), by August Wilson

G 
G. David Schine in Hell (1996), by Tony Kushner
Gary: A Sequel to Titus Andronicus (2019), by Taylor Mac
 Gem of the Ocean (2003), by August Wilson
 Getting Out (1979), by Marsha Norman
 The Gingerbread Lady (1970), by Neil Simon
 The Glass Menagerie (1944), by Tennessee Williams
 Glengarry Glen Ross (1983), by David Mamet
 God (1975), by Woody Allen
 God's Favorite (1974), by Neil Simon
 Gods of the Lightning (1929), by Maxwell Anderson and Harold Hickerson
 The Golden Years (1940), by Arthur Miller
 The Good Doctor (1973), by Neil Simon
The Great Disobedience (1938), by Arthur Miller
 The Great God Brown (1926), by Eugene O'Neill
 The Grass Still Grows (1938), by Arthur Miller
 Gypsy (1929), by Maxwell Anderson

H 
 The Hairy Ape (1922), by Eugene O'Neill
 The Half-Bridge (1943), by Arthur Miller
 Happy Birthday, Wanda June (1960), by Kurt Vonnegut
 The Happy Time (1951), by Samuel A. Taylor
 Harvey (1944), by Mary Chase
 The Haves and the Have Nots (2012), by Tyler Perry
 The Heiress (1947), by Ruth Goetz and Augustus Goetz
 Hell Hath No Fury Like a Woman Scorned (2014), by Tyler Perry
 Hello Out There (1941), by William Saroyan
 Hidden Agendas (1994), by Terrence McNally
 High Tor (1937), by Maxwell Anderson
Hilary and Clinton (2016), by Lucas Hnath
Homebody/Kabul (2001), by Tony Kushner
 The Homecoming (1989), by August Wilson
 Honors at Dawn (1938), by Arthur Miller
 How I Learned What I Learned (2002), by August Wilson

I 
 I Can Do Bad All by Myself (1999), by Tyler Perry
 I Know I've Been Changed (1998), by Tyler Perry
 I Never Sang for My Father (1968), by Robert Anderson
 I Ought to Be in Pictures (1979), by Neil Simon
 I Think About You a Great Deal (1986), by Arthur Miller
 The Iceman Cometh (1939), by Eugene O'Neill
 In Abraham's Bosom (1927), by Paul Eliot Green
 Incident at Vichy (1964), by Arthur Miller
The Inheritance (2018), by Matthew Lopez
The Intelligent Homosexual's Guide to Capitalism and Socialism with a Key to the Scriptures (2009), by Tony Kushner
Isaac's Eye (2013), by Lucas Hnath
 It's Only a Play (1986), by Terrence McNally

J  
 Jake's Women (1992), by Neil Simon
 Jerico-Jim Crow (1964), by Langston Hughes
 Jim Dandy (1947), by William Saroyan
 Jitney (1982), by August Wilson
 Joe Turner's Come and Gone (1984), by August Wilson

K 
 Keep Your Pantheon (2007), by David Mamet
 Key Largo (1939), by Maxwell Anderson
 King Hedley II (1999), by August Wilson
 Knickerbocker Holiday (1938), by Maxwell Anderson

L 
 Ladies and Gentlemen (1939), by Ben Hecht and Charles MacArthur
 Lady Day at Emerson's Bar and Grill (1986), by Lanie Robertson
 Lakeboat (1970), by David Mamet
 The Last Act Is a Solo (1991), by Robert Anderson
 Last of the Red Hot Lovers (1969), by Neil Simon
 The Last Pad (1973), by William Inge
 The Last Yankee (1991), by Arthur Miller
 Laugh to Keep from Crying (2009), by Tyler Perry
 Laughter on the 23rd Floor (1993), by Neil Simon
 The Leather Apron Club (2016), by Charlie Mount
 Legend (1976), by Samuel A. Taylor
 Lettering (2013), by Jim Beaver
 A Life in the Theatre (1977), by David Mamet
 Lips Together, Teeth Apart (1991), by Terrence McNally
 The Lisbon Traviata (1989), by Terrence McNally
 Listen My Children (1939), by Arthur Miller and Norman Rosten
 Little Ham (1936), by Langston Hughes
 The Live Wire (1950), by Garson Kanin
 Lobby Hero (2001), by Kenneth Lonergan
 London Suite (1994), by Neil Simon
 Lone Canoe (1972), by David Mamet
 Long Day's Journey Into Night (1956), by Eugene O'Neill
 A Loss of Roses (1959), by William Inge
 The Lost Colony (1937), by Paul Eliot Green
 Lost in Yonkers (1990), by Neil Simon
 Love! Valour! Compassion! (1994), by Terrence McNally

M 
 M. Butterfly (1988), by David Henry Hwang
 Ma Rainey's Black Bottom (1982), by August Wilson
 A Madea Christmas (2011), by Tyler Perry
 Madea's Class Reunion (2003), by Tyler Perry
 Madea's Family Reunion (2002), by Tyler Perry
 Madea Gets a Job (2012), by Tyler Perry
 Madea Goes to Jail (2006), by Tyler Perry
 Madea's Big Happy Family (2010), by Tyler Perry
 Madea's Neighbors from Hell (2014), by Tyler Perry
 The Maid of Arran (1882), by L. Frank Baum
 The Man Who Came to Dinner (1939), by George S. Kaufman and Moss Hart
 The Man Who Had All the Luck (1940), by Arthur Miller
 The Marriage Counselor (2008), by Tyler Perry
 Master Class (1995), by Terrence McNally
 The Masque of Kings (1936), by Maxwell Anderson
 Mary of Scotland (1933), by Maxwell Anderson
 The Meadow (1947), by Ray Bradbury
 Meet the Browns (2005), by Tyler Perry
 Mockingbird (2003), by Jim Beaver
 The Monkey Jar (2008), by Richard Martin Hirsch
 Mourning Becomes Electra (1931), by Eugene O'Neill
 Mr. Happiness (1978), by David Mamet
 Mr Peters' Connections (1998), by Arthur Miller
 Mule Bone (1931), by Langston Hughes and Zora Neale Hurston 
 Murder in the Cathedral (1935), by T.S. Eliot
 My Heart's in the Highlands] (1940), by William Saroyan

N 
 Natural Affection (1963), by William Inge
 Next (1969), by Terrence McNally
 'night, Mother (1983), by Marsha Norman
 The Night of the Iguana (1961), by Tennessee Williams
 Night Over Taos (1932), by Maxwell Anderson
 Night Riders (2006), by Jim Beaver
 Nina (1951), by Samuel A. Taylor
 No Villain (1936), by Arthur Miller
 Noon (1968), second segment of Morning, Noon and Night, by Terrence McNally
 November (2008), by David Mamet

O 
 The Odd Couple (1965), by Neil Simon
 The Old Neighborhood (1997), by David Mamet
 Oleanna (1992), by David Mamet
 On Golden Pond (1979), by Ernest Thompson
 Once Upon a Single Bound (1974), by Jim Beaver
One Night in Miami (2013), by Kemp Powers
 Otho: a Tragedy, in Five Acts (1819), by John Neal
 Our Ephraim, or The New Englanders, A What-d’ye-call-it?–in three Acts (1835), by John Neal
 Our Mrs. McChesney (1915), by Edna Ferber and George V. Hobart
 Our Town (1938), by Thornton Wilder
 Outside Looking In (1925), by Maxwell Anderson
 The Ox-Bow Incident (1976), adapted by Jim Beaver

P 
 The Parsley Garden (1992), by William Saroyan
 The Penitent (2017), by David Mamet
 Period of Adjustment (1960), by Tennessee Williams
 Peter and the Starcatcher (2009), by Rick Elice
 The Petrified Forest (1935), by Robert E. Sherwood
 The Piano Lesson (1987), by August Wilson
 Picnic (1953), by William Inge
 Pillar of Fire and Other Plays (1975), by Ray Bradbury
 Play It Again, Sam (1969), by Woody Allen
 Plaza Suite (1968), by Neil Simon
 The Pleasure of His Company (1958), by Samuel A. Taylor
 The Poet & the Rent (1986), by David Mamet
 Prairie du Chien (1979), by David Mamet
 Prelude and Liebestod (1989), by Terrence McNally
 Pressing Engagements (1990), by Jim Beaver
 The Price (1968), by Arthur Miller
 The Prince of Parthia (1765), by Thomas Godfrey
 The Prisoner of Second Avenue (1971), by Neil Simon
 Proposals (1997), by Neil Simon
A Public Reading of an Unproduced Screenplay About the Death of Walt Disney (2013), by Lucas Hnath

R 
 Race (2009), by David Mamet
 Radio Golf (2003), by August Wilson
 A Raisin in the Sun (1959), by Lorraine Hansberry
 The Rat Race (1949), by Garson Kanin
 Recycle (1973), by August Wilson
Red Speedo (2013), by Lucas Hnath
 Resurrection Blues (2002), by Arthur Miller
 Reunion (1976), by David Mamet
 The Revenge of the Space Pandas, or Binky Rudich and the Two-Speed Clock (1978), by David Mamet
 The Ride Down Mt. Morgan (1991), by Arthur Miller
 The Ritz (1975), by Terrence McNally
 The Rock (1934), by T.S. Eliot
 Romance (2005), by David Mamet
 Rose's Dilemma (2003), by Neil Simon
 The Royal Family (1927), by Edna Ferber and George S. Kaufman
 Rumors (1988), by Neil Simon

S 
 Sabrina Fair (1953), by Samuel A. Taylor
 Saturday's Children (1927), by Maxwell Anderson
 School (2009), by David Mamet
 School Girls; Or, the African Mean Girls Play (2017), by Jocelyn Bioh
 Schooling Giacomo (2008), by Richard Knipe
 Second Overture (1938), by Maxwell Anderson
 Semper Fi (1982), by Jim Beaver
 Seven Guitars (1995), by August Wilson
 Sexual Perversity in Chicago (1974), by David Mamet
 The Shawl (1985), by David Mamet
 Sidekick (1981), by Jim Beaver
 The Sign in Sidney Brustein's Window (1964), by Lorraine Hansberry
 Silent Night, Lonely Night (1959), by Robert Anderson
 Simply Heavenly (1957), by Langston Hughes
 The Slaughter of the Innocents (1952), by William Saroyan
Slavs! (1994), by Tony Kushner
 The Smile of the World (1949), by Garson Kanin
 Solitaire/Double Solitaire (1970), by Robert Anderson
 Some Men (2006), by Terrence McNally
 Something Cloudy, Something Clear (1981), by Tennessee Williams
 Spades (1980), by Jim Beaver
 Speed-the-Plow (1988), by David Mamet
 Squirrels (1974), by David Mamet
 Stage Door (1926), by Edna Ferber and George S. Kaufman
 The Star-Spangled Girl (1966), by Neil Simon
 Starstruck (1980), by Elaine Lee
 The Stendhal Syndrome (2004), by Terrence McNally
 The Stolen Secret (1954), by William Saroyan
 Street Scene (1929), by Elmer Rice
 A Streetcar Named Desire (1947), by Tennessee Williams The Subject Was Roses (1964), by Frank D. Gilroy
 Subway Circus (1940), by William Saroyan
 Summer and Smoke (1948), by Tennessee Williams
 Summer Brave (1962), by William Inge
 The Sunshine Boys (1972), by Neil Simon
 The Sleeping Car (1883), by William Dean Howells
 The Star-Wagon (1937), by Maxwell Anderson
 Sweeney Agonistes (publicată 1926, jucată 1934), by T.S. Eliot
 Sweet Bird of Youth (1959), by Tennessee Williams
 Sweet Eros (1968), by Terrence McNally

 T 
 Talking to You (1942), by William Saroyan
 Tambourines to Glory (1956), by Langston Hughes
 Tammy Faye's Final Audition (2015), by Merri Biechler
 Tea and Sympathy (1953), by Robert Anderson
 A Teaspoon Every Four Hours (1969), by Jackie Mason and Mike Mortman
 That Championship Season (1972), by Jason Miller
 There's Wisdom in Women (1935), by Joseph Kesselring
 They Too Arise (1937), by Arthur Miller
 They're Made Out of Meat (1991), by Terry Bisson
 This Is Our Youth (1996), by Kenneth Lonergan
 The Time of Your Life (1939), by William Saroyan
 To Kill a Mockingbird (2018), by Aaron Sorkin
 Torch Song Trilogy (1982), by Harvey Fierstein
 The Trip to Bountiful (1953), by Horton Foote
 Troubled Island (1936), by Langston Hughes and William Grant Still
 Truth, Justice, and the Texican Way (1986), by Jim Beaver
 Twentieth Century (1932), by Ben Hecht and Charles MacArthur
 Two for the Seesaw (1958), by William Gibson
 Two Trains Running (1990), by August Wilson

 U 
 Under the Gaslight (1867), by Augustin Daly

 V Valley Forge (1934), by Maxwell Anderson
 Van Zorn (1914), by Edwin Arlington Robinson
 Vanya and Sonia and Masha and Spike (2012), by Christopher Durang
 Verdigris (1985), by Jim Beaver
 The Very First Christmas Morning (1962), by Kurt Vonnegut
 The Vikings and Darwin (2008), by David Mamet
 Visit to a Small Planet (1957), by Gore Vidal
 Visiting Mr. Green (1996), by Jeff Baron

 W 
 The Water Engine (1976), by David Mamet
 The Waverly Gallery (2000), by Kenneth Lonergan
 Weekend (1968), by Gore Vidal
 The West Side Waltz (1981), by Ernest Thompson
 What Price Glory (1924), by Maxwell Anderson and Laurence Stallings
 What's Done in the Dark (2007), by Tyler Perry
 Where Has Tommy Flowers Gone? (1971), by Terrence McNally
 Where's Daddy? (1966), by William Inge
 Whigs, Pigs, and Greyhounds (2011), by Jim Beaver
 Whiskey (1973), by Terrence McNally
 White Desert (1923), by Maxwell Anderson
 Who's Afraid of Virginia Woolf? (1962), by Edward Albee
 Why Did I Get Married? (2004), by Tyler PerryThe Wingless Victory (1936), by Maxwell AndersonWinterset (1935), by Maxwell Anderson
 The Wonderful Ice Cream Suit and Other Plays (1972), by Ray BradburyWhy We Have a Body (1993), by Claire Chafee

 X 

 Y 
 You Can't Take It with You (1936), by George S. Kaufman and Moss Hart
 You Know I Can't Hear You When the Water's Running (1967), by Robert Anderson
 You're Welcome America (2009), by Will Ferrell

 Z 
 Zero Hour (2006), by Jim Brochu
 Zorro in Hell (2006), by Richard Montoya, Ric Salinas and Herbert Siguenza
 The Zoo Story'' (1959), by Edward Albee

See also

 List of American playwrights
 Theater of the United States
 Broadway theatre
 List of one-act plays by Tennessee Williams
 Plays of L. Frank Baum
 List of German plays

References

Lists of plays